Cindy Lerner (born August 21, 1952) is an American politician. She served as a Democratic member for the 119th district of the Florida House of Representatives.

Lerner was born in Norfolk, Virginia, and moved to Florida in 1960. She attended Newcomb College of Tulane University, earning her bachelor's degree in 1974. She then attended Emory University School of Law, where she earned her Juris Doctor degree in 1978. In 2000, Lerner won the election for the 119th district of the Florida House of Representatives. She succeeded John F. Cosgrove. In 2002, Lerner was succeeded by Juan C. Zapata for the 119th district.

Lerner wrote a column for The Huffington Post in 2012.

References 

1952 births
Living people
Politicians from Norfolk, Virginia
Democratic Party members of the Florida House of Representatives
21st-century American politicians
21st-century American women politicians
Emory University School of Law alumni